Adabaria, Patuakhali is a village in Bauphal Upazila of Patuakhali District of southern-central Bangladesh.

References

Villages in Patuakhali District
Villages in Barisal Division